Jacinto "Jing" Villegas Paras (born September 11, 1953) is a Filipino lawyer and politician who is a member of the Cabinet of the Philippines and current Presidential Adviser on Political Affairs of President Rodrigo Duterte with the rank of Secretary.

Personal life 
Jing Paras finished his Elementary and High School education from St. Francis College in the City of Guihulngan, Negros Oriental. For college, he finished from University of the Philippines Diliman with a Bachelor of Arts in Economics degree. He is a member of Upsilon Sigma Phi.

He then got his Bachelor of Laws in 1985 from the University of the Philippines College of Law, and a Masters in Business Administration in 1983 from De La Salle University.

He was President and CEO of the Pantranco Bus Company from 1990 to 1992, Director of the United Coconut Planters Bank, Director of the Philippine Communications Satellite Corporation from 1993 to 1998, and President and CEO of Call Telecoms Inc. from 1995 to 1998.

He also sat as Chairman of the Board of the Philippine National Oil Company from 2008 to 2010, as President and CEO of World Spices International Cuisine Inc. from 2011 to 2017, and Legal Adviser of the Volunteers Against Crime and Corruption from 2016 to 2017.

Public service 
He was a Mayor of the City of Guihulngan, Negros Oriental from 1986 to 1988, Assistant Secretary of the Department of Agrarian Reform from 1988 to 1989, Assistant Director (with the rank of Assistant Secretary) of the Municipal Telephone Program of the Department of Transportation and Communications from 1989 to 1992, and Head of the DOTC Action Center from 1989 to 1992.

He was elected as member of the House of Representatives from 1998 to 2007. As Representative, he was Chairman of the Special Committee on Food Security from 1998 to 2001, Chairman of the Committee on Transportation and Communications from 2001 to 2007, Vice-Chairman of the Committee on Franchises from 1998 to 2007.

He also served as Undersecretary of the Department of Labor and Employment before being appointed as Undersecretary of the Presidential Legislative Liaison Office (PLLO).

References 

Mayors of places in Negros Oriental
1953 births
Living people
Members of the House of Representatives of the Philippines from Negros Oriental
University of the Philippines Diliman alumni